Victor Ash, also known as Ash, is a Copenhagen-based artist originally from Paris, France.
Ash primarily works on canvas, lithography, and sometimes installations. He has exhibited regularly in various museums and galleries around the world since the late 1980s.

Early career
Ash started his artistic career as a graffiti writer in the early 1980s. From 1983 to 1986 he also called himself Saho and Ash2. He was part of the Parisian graffiti collective BBC or Badbc, and was a contemporary of Bando, Mode2, and JonOne.

In 1989 The French fashion designer Agnès b. invited Ash, JonOne and several other graffiti artists to take part in the exhibition "Les peintres de la ville" at the Galerie du Jour situated in the neighborhood of Beaubourg in Paris. This was the first time Ash was showing his paintings inside a gallery.

Recent development

Ash's newest pieces are aesthetically very different from the graffiti he was painting in the 80s, and are a departure from the traditional graffiti styles of New York. Ash often uses the themes of contrast between the urban environments and nature and young people's quest for identity in subcultures.

Ash lives in Frederiksberg, Copenhagen, Denmark.

References 

 interview in Jyllands Posten 2013.
 interview Zeit Online Germany 2009.
 interview in Potilitken Denmark 2008.
 Ash at Backjumps 2007

Further reading
 Spraycan Art, by Henry Chalfant - documents some of Ash's older work
 VICTORASH WALLS, Editions Third Space, 2013, 
 Paris art libre dans la ville, Yvan Tessier, Éditions Hersher, 1991, 
 Paris Tonkar, Tarek ben Yakhlef et Sylvain Doriath, Editions Florent Massot et Romain Pillement, 1991, 
 Spraycan Art, Henry Chalfant and James Prigoff, Thames and Hudson, 1987, 
 La rue aux artistes, MPG Art, editions Guillaume Garouste Ategalore, 2004, 
 Mural Art, Kiriakos Losifidis, Publikat, 2008,

External links 
 
 Backjumps
 BOMB IT Movie
 graffiti.org

Living people
French graffiti artists
French expatriates in Denmark
1968 births